Sorj Chalandon (born 16 May 1952 in Tunis) is a French writer and journalist.

Biography 
Chalandon grew up in Lyon with his parents and brother. His father was intensely paranoid and violent, making his family life difficult. When Chalandon was ten years old, his grandfather revealed to him that his father had been a Nazi collaborator during the Second World War, contrary to the heroic stories his father had told him throughout his childhood. It was not until 2020 that he knew the true nature and extent of his father's collaboration, six years after his father's death. His memoir on this subject, Enfant de salaud, was shortlisted for the Prix Goncourt in 2021.

At the age of 21, he became a cartoonist at Libération. He worked as a journalist for the newspaper from 1973 until 2007, where, among other things, he covered events in Lebanon, Iran, Iraq, Somalia and Afghanistan. In 1988 he received the Albert-Londres Prize for his articles on Northern Ireland and the Klaus Barbie trial. Since his departure from Libération, he has worked for the satirical-investigative newspaper Le Canard enchaîné.

After a long career in journalism, he turned to literature; he wrote Le Petit Bonzi in 2005, thinking that it would be his first and last novel. However, he went on to write several others, many of which have received literary prizes. His second novel, Une promesse (2006), won the Prix Médicis, and his 2011 novel Return to Killybegs won the Grand Prix du roman de l'Académie française and was shortlisted for the Prix Goncourt.

Works
 Le Petit Bonzi (2005)
 Une promesse (2006, Prix Médicis)
 My Traitor (Mon traître, 2008)
 La Légende de nos pères (2009)
 Return to Killybegs (Retour à Killybegs, 2011, Grand Prix du roman de l'Académie française)
 The Fourth Wall (Le Quatrième Mur, Prix Goncourt des Lycéens 2013)
 Profession du père (2015)
 Le jour d'avant (2017)
 Une joie féroce (2019)
 Enfant de salaud (2021)

References 

French journalists
20th-century French novelists
20th-century French male writers
21st-century French novelists
Prix Médicis winners
Grand Prix du roman de l'Académie française winners
Albert Londres Prize recipients
Joseph Kessel Prize recipients
Prix Jean Freustié winners
Prix Goncourt des lycéens winners
Writers from Tunis
1952 births
Living people
French male novelists
21st-century French male writers
French male non-fiction writers